The Crown Hotel is a hotel and pub in Poole, Dorset, England. It is a traditional pub/inn with a cream painted exterior and red placard.

It became a Grade II listed building in 1974.

References

Hotels in Dorset
Buildings and structures in Poole
Grade II listed buildings in Dorset